Streetly railway station is a disused station on the Midland Railway in England. It was opened in 1879 and closed in 1965, although the track through the station is still in use for freight.

It was located on the corner of Foley Road and Thornhill Road. There was a booking office and a ladies' waiting room located on the Birmingham-bound platform, whilst the Walsall-bound platform had a signal box upon it.

References

Disused railway stations in Walsall
Railway stations in Great Britain opened in 1879
Railway stations in Great Britain closed in 1965
1879 establishments in England
1965 disestablishments in England
Beeching closures in England
Former Midland Railway stations